The Journal of Information Technology & Politics is a quarterly peer-reviewed academic journal that was established in 2004 by Haworth Press as the Journal of E-Government. It obtained its current name in 2007 when the journal switched to Routledge. It is an official journal of the section on Information Technology & Politics of the American Political Science Association. The editor-in-chief is Stuart W. Shulman (University of Massachusetts Amherst). The journal covers research on the interaction of information technology with political and governmental processes. It is abstracted and indexed by Scopus.

External links
 

Computer science journals
Political science journals
Taylor & Francis academic journals
Quarterly journals
Publications established in 2004
English-language journals